Garden Park is a multi-use stadium in Kitwe, Zambia.  It is currently used mostly for football matches and serves as the home for Kitwe United Football Club. The stadium holds 10,000 people.

References

Kitwe
Football venues in Zambia
Buildings and structures in Copperbelt Province